Anastasiia Matrosova (born January 3, 1982) is a Ukrainian judoka.

She finished in joint fifth place in the half-heavyweight (78 kg) division at the 2004 Summer Olympics, having lost the bronze medal match to Lucia Morico of Italy.

External links
 
 Yahoo! Sports

1982 births
Living people
Ukrainian female judoka
Judoka at the 2004 Summer Olympics
Olympic judoka of Ukraine
Place of birth missing (living people)
21st-century Ukrainian women